Projected area is the two 
dimensional area measurement of a three-dimensional object by projecting its shape on to an arbitrary plane. This is often used in mechanical engineering and architectural engineering related fields, especially for hardness testing, axial stress, wind pressures, and terminal velocity.

The geometrical definition of a projected area is: "the rectilinear parallel projection of a surface of any shape onto a plane". This translates into the equation:

See also
Surface area

References

Engineering concepts